Gastón Américo Benavídez (born 23 October 1995) is an Argentine professional footballer who plays as a right-back for Talleres, on loan from Estudiantes.

Career
Benavídez started his senior career with hometown club Tiro Federal. He remained with the fourth tier outfit between 2013 and 2016, making a total of seventy-two appearances for them. 2017 saw Benavídez head to Río Cuarto with Estudiantes of Torneo Federal A; tier three. He debuted in a goalless draw at home to Unión Villa Krause on 8 October, before scoring his first senior league goal in a 4–2 victory over Juventud Unida Universitario on 12 March 2018. After appearing twenty times in all competitions in 2017–18, Benavídez featured in twenty-eight matches in 2018–19 as they won promotion as champions.

After thirty Primera B Nacional appearances for Estudiantes, Benavídez departed on 9 February 2021 to Primera División side Arsenal de Sarandí; amid interest from Talleres. He made his debut on 13 February at the Estadio Pedro Bidegain away to San Lorenzo, having replaced Julián Navas with thirteen minutes left of an eventual 2–1 loss.

On 31 January 2022, Benavídez was loaned out to Talleres for one year, with a purchase option.

Career statistics
.

Honours
Estudiantes
Torneo Federal A: 2018–19

Notes

References

External links

1995 births
Living people
Sportspeople from Córdoba Province, Argentina
Argentine footballers
Association football defenders
Torneo Argentino B players
Torneo Federal A players
Primera Nacional players
Argentine Primera División players
Estudiantes de Río Cuarto footballers
Arsenal de Sarandí footballers
Talleres de Córdoba footballers